Morehampton Road (Irish: Bóthar Morehampton) is a road running through Donnybrook in Dublin, Ireland. It runs from the junction of Upper Leeson Street and Sussex Road to Donnybrook Road. It meets Wellington Place, Herbert Park and Marlborough Road.

The Road is known for its examples of large Victorian townhouses. The Grove wildlife sanctuary is also located on the road, occupying 0.5 hectares at the corner of Wellington Place. The site was donated to the state by Miss Kathleen Goodfellow.

The road derives its name from Morehampton Park, the Herefordshire seat of the Hoskyns baronets; John Hoskyns (1784–1858), son of Sir Hungerford Hoskyns, 6th Baronet, built his house in this area and called it Morehampton.

Éamon de Valera lived on the nearby Morehampton Terrace from 1910.

See also
List of streets and squares in Dublin

Further reading

References

Streets in Dublin (city)
Ballsbridge